John Cummings Anderson (born 1975) is an American attorney who served as the United States Attorney for the United States District Court for the District of New Mexico from 2018 to 2021.

Early life and education 
Anderson was born and raised in Smithtown, New York. He earned an AB in Philosophy from Bowdoin College, and spent a year abroad at the Queen's University Belfast. He earned a Juris Doctor from the Fordham University School of Law, serving as a clerk for Paul Joseph Kelly Jr. of the United States Court of Appeals for the Tenth Circuit.

Career 
After earning his undergraduate degree, Anderson spent two years as a teacher at Morris Catholic High School. He also worked as a summer intern at the Kazakhstan International Bureau for Human Rights and Rule of Law in Bishkek.

After graduating from law school, Anderson was of counsel at Holland & Hart in Santa Fe, New Mexico. Anderson's legal practice focused on litigation and government investigations. From 2008 to 2013, he was an Assistant United States Attorney for the District of New Mexico. Before that, Anderson worked as a litigation associate at Simpson Thacher & Bartlett in New York City.

As an Assistant U.S. Attorney, Anderson prosecuted a number of individuals in high-profile political scandals in New Mexico. He prosecuted Governor Susana Martinez's former campaign manager for intercepting Martinez's emails and he prosecuted a Democratic political consultant who pleaded guilty to possession of child pornography.

On February 15, 2018, his nomination to be the United States Attorney was confirmed by voice vote. He was sworn into office on February 23, 2018. He resigned on January 2, 2021.

References

External links
 Biography at U.S. Department of Justice
 Biography at the National Law Review

1975 births
Living people
Bowdoin College alumni
Fordham University School of Law alumni
New Mexico lawyers
People from Smithtown, New York
21st-century American lawyers
United States Attorneys for the District of New Mexico
Assistant United States Attorneys